Chiang Yu-man (born 30 July 1961), better known by her stage name Long Qianyu, is a Taiwanese Hokkien pop singer. She has released 55 albums.

External links

1961 births
Living people
Taiwanese Buddhists
Taiwanese Hokkien pop singers
Taiwanese Mandopop singers
Musicians from Keelung
20th-century Taiwanese women singers
21st-century Taiwanese women singers